Freudian is the debut studio album by Canadian singer and songwriter Daniel Caesar. It was released independently on August 25, 2017, by Golden Child Recordings, with distribution from TuneCore. It includes guest appearances from Kali Uchis, H.E.R., Syd, Charlotte Day Wilson and Sean Leon. Production derives from Caesar, Matthew Burnett, Jordan Evans, BadBadNotGood, Alex Ernewein, Riley Bell and Jordon Manswell. The album succeeds the 2015 EP Pilgrim's Paradise. The album was nominated for a Grammy in the Best R&B Album Category, alongside a nomination for Best R&B Performance with "Get You" at the 60th Annual Grammy Awards, with "Best Part" with H.E.R. winning Best R&B Performance at the 61st Annual Grammy Awards.

The album was supported by the singles "Get You" featuring Kali Uchis and the double single "We Find Love" / "Blessed".

Singles
The lead single "Get You" featuring Kali Uchis was released on October 20, 2016, for streaming and digital download. The second single, "We Find Love" / "Blessed" was released on June 9, 2017.

Artwork
The album artwork features photography by creative directors Keavan Yazdani and Sean Brown. The photograph is Caesar climbing an incline on the Monument to 1300 Years of Bulgaria, Shumen.

Critical reception

Freudian received widespread acclaim from critics upon release. In a positive review, Briana Younger of Pitchfork complimented the gospel elements of the album, stating: "There’s much here that blends well into this 1990s-obsessed era, but Caesar’s gospel background is his not-so-secret weapon. While he’s surely not the only contemporary R&B singer who grew up in the church, he doesn’t shy away from bringing the full range of his influences to his music. Caesar’s willingness to use all of the tools at his disposal—to explore his own id and superego right alongside love’s heaven and hell—elevates his craft."

Kevin Ritchie of Now commented that Freudian is "not an album of sweeping gestures, but rather an ambling, pleasant account of a 20-something falling in and out of love. It’s full of small moments, nuance and detail." Ryan Patrick of Exclaim! praised the production and originality: "Freudian isn't about whatever's passing for the genre on streaming playlists, radio or video; it isn't even a throwback. It's a carefully created album rooted in classic gospel and R&B, and a revelation in a world of sludgy alt-R&B, an outlier among overtly soulless genre takes hailed as the next thing because no one knows any better."

Exclaim! ranked the album at number 5 on their "Top 10 Soul and R&B Albums of 2017".

The album was a shortlisted finalist for the 2018 Polaris Music Prize.

Commercial performance
Freudian debuted at number 25 on the Billboard 200. On September 1, 2017, Freudian entered the UK R&B Chart at number 15, while entering the UK Independent Chart at number 40.

Track listing

Notes
  signifies an additional producer.
  signifies a co-producer.
 "Hold Me Down" features additional vocals by Cadaro Tribe.
 "Neu Roses (Transgressor's Song)" and "Loose" feature additional vocals by Nevon Sinclair.
 "Freudian" features additional vocals by Sean Leon.

Sample credits
 "Hold Me Down" contains an interpolation of "Hold Me Now", written and performed by Kirk Franklin.
 "We Find Love" contains an interpolation of "We Fall Down", written by Kyle David Matthews and performed by Donnie McClurkin.

Personnel
Credits adapted from the liner notes of Freudian and Daniel Caesar's Instagram.

Artists
 Daniel Caesar
 Charlotte Day Wilson – featured artist (also engineer)
 H.E.R. – featured artist
 Kali Uchis – featured artist
 Syd – featured artist (also engineer)

Production
 Matthew Burnett – producer, executive producer, A&R, management
 Jordan Evans – producer, executive producer, A&R, management, engineer
 Alex Ernewein – producer
 Jordon Manswell – producer
 Riley Bell – producer, engineer

Other musicians
 BadBadNotGood – additional music (credited for additional production)
 C.J. Mairs – additional music
 Cadaro Tribe – additional vocals
 Ian Culley – additional music
 Nevon Sinclair – additional vocals
 Sean Barrow – additional music
 Sean Leon – additional vocals
 Steve Henry – additional music
 Wesley Allen – additional music

Other technical
 Calvin Hartwick – engineer
 Eric Stenman – engineer
 Ethan Ashby – engineer
 Jeremy Nichols – engineer

Other management
 Angelika Heim – legal
 Anthony Osei – publicity
 John Ingram – legal

Design
 Eric Lachance – packaging design
 Keavan Yazdani – artwork
 Sean Brown – artwork

Charts

Weekly charts

Year-end charts

Certifications

References

2017 debut albums
Self-released albums
Daniel Caesar albums
Albums produced by BadBadNotGood
Juno Award for R&B/Soul Recording of the Year recordings